Saba Zafar is an Indian Politician From Janata Dal (United). He was elected to the assembly in 2010 from Amour (Vidhan Sabha constituency), which is part of Kishanganj (Lok Sabha constituency) after delimitation. Saba Zafar is contested election on BJP ticket from Amour (Vidhan Sabha constituency) in  2015 Bihar Legislative Assembly election. He Joined Janata Dal (United) For 2020 Bihar Polls

Saba Zafar is a Kulahia Muslim. He did his graduation from Patna University. Saba defeated  Abdul Jalil Mastan (Surjapuri Muslim) of Congress by over 18,000 votes in Amour in 2010 Bihar Legislative Assembly election.

References

Living people
Bihar MLAs 2010–2015
People from Purnia district
1973 births
Bihar MLAs 2020–2025
Janata Dal (United) politicians